The Dikhit Rajputs are a sub-group within the Khanzada community. There is a sense of Rajput identity amongst the Dikhit Khanzada, especially among those of Fatehpur District. In their marriages too, Rajput customs are followed, like bursting of firecrackers and sending specially made laddoos to community members, which form part of marriage celebrations. The community also practices clan exogamy, marrying into other Khanzada communities such as the Gautam Khanzada. Although Rajput traditions remain strong, the community is far more orthodox then neighbouring Khanzada communities.

References

Khanzada
Rajput clans
Muslim communities of Uttar Pradesh